Insurgency in Yemen or Yemeni insurgency may refer to any of the following:

Al-Qaeda insurgency in Yemen (1998–present)
Houthi insurgency in Yemen (2004–2014)
South Yemen insurgency (2009–present)

See also
Aden Emergency, also known as the Radfan uprising
Terrorism in Yemen
Yemeni Civil War (disambiguation)